Chad A. Verdi is an American film producer born in East Greenwich, Rhode Island. He is best known for his work Inkubus, story of a skeleton crew.

Biography

In 2009, Verdi entered the film industry, acquiring the rights to the story of boxer Vinny Pazienza. He produced his first film in 2011, a horror movie Inkubus, starring Robert Englund.

This was followed in 2011 by Loosies, with Peter Facinelli and Jamie Alexander. Verdi has produced or executive produced more than thirty-one films, including four films directed by Martin Scorsese. His work includes Silence, The 50 Year Argument, The Irishman,and a documentary about September 11 hero. Other work includes Welles Crowther , Bleed for This (2016) stars Miles Teller as boxer Vinny Pazienza, Aaron Eckhart as Kevin Rooney, with Ben Younger directing and Martin Scorsese as executive producer. Verdi has also produced Wander, an american thriller with Tommy Lee Jones and Aaron Eckhart.

Filmography
He was a producer in all films unless otherwise noted.

Film

As an actor

References

External links
 

Year of birth missing (living people)
Living people
People from Cranston, Rhode Island
American film producers